Robert Fraser may refer to:

Robert Fraser (art dealer) (1937–1986), London art dealer of the 1960s and beyond
Robert Fraser (bishop) (1858–1914), Scottish Roman Catholic Bishop of Dunkeld
Robert Fraser (cricketer) (born 1954), Australian cricketer
Robert Fraser (ITV) (1904–1985), Australian journalist
Robert Fraser (politician), Member of the Legislative Assembly, for Electoral district of Brisbane North, Queensland
Bob Fraser (TV producer) (1945–2011), American television producer, writer and actor
Bob Fraser (footballer), Scottish football player (Aberdeen FC)
Robert Fraser (writer) (born 1947), British author and biographer
Robert Henry Fraser (1869–1947), New Zealand stained glass artist

In fiction
Sergeant Robert Fraser, a character in the television series Due South (1994–1999)

See also
Robert Frazer (disambiguation)
Robert Frazier (disambiguation)
Robert C. Frasure (1942–1995), U.S. diplomat